The 1974 European Cup Winners' Cup Final was a football match of the 1973–74 European Cup Winners' Cup and the 14th European Cup Winners' Cup final. It was contested between Magdeburg of East Germany and the defending champions, Milan of Italy, and was held at Feijenoord Stadion in Rotterdam, Netherlands. Magdeburg won the match 2–0 thanks to goals by Enrico Lanzi (own goal) and Wolfgang Seguin. It was the only time one of the major European trophies was won by an East German club.

Route to the final

Match

Details

See also
1973–74 European Cup Winners' Cup
1974 European Cup Final
1974 UEFA Cup Final
A.C. Milan in European football

References

External links
UEFA Cup Winners' Cup results at Rec.Sport.Soccer Statistics Foundation
Match report

3
1. FC Magdeburg matches
A.C. Milan matches
International club association football competitions hosted by the Netherlands
1974
1973–74 in Dutch football
1973–74 in East German football
1973–74 in Italian football
May 1974 sports events in Europe
Sports competitions in Rotterdam
20th century in Rotterdam